Washingtonia filifera, the desert fan palm, California fan palm, or California palm, is a flowering plant in the palm family Arecaceae, native to the far southwestern United States and Baja California, Mexico. It has a sturdy, columnar trunk and waxy, fan-shaped (palmate) leaves.

Names
The Latin specific epithet filifera means "thread-bearing".

Description

The California fan palm is also known as the desert fan palm, American cotton palm, and Arizona fan palm.

They have long, thread-like, white fibers, and the petioles are pure green with yellow edges and filifera-filaments, between the segments. The trunk is gray and tan, and the leaves are gray green. When the fronds die, they remain attached and drop down to cloak the trunk in a wide skirt. The shelter that the skirt creates provides a microhabitat for many small birds and invertebrates.

Washingtonia filifera typically lives from 80 to 250 years or more.

Distribution
Washingtonia filifera is the only palm native to the Western United States and one of the country's largest native palms, exceeded in height only by the Cuban or Florida royal palm.

Primary populations are found in desert riparian habitats at spring-fed and stream-fed oases in the Colorado Desert and at a few scattered locations in the Mojave Desert. It is also found near watercourses in the Sonoran Desert along the Gila River in Yuma, along the Hassayampa River and near New River in Maricopa County, and in portions of Pima County, Pinal County, Mohave County (along the Colorado River), and several other isolated locations in Clark County, Nevada. In Mexico, it is native only to the state of Baja California, where occurs in isolated canyons and oases as far south as Bahía de los Angeles. It is a naturalized species in the warm springs near Death Valley and in the extreme northwest of Sonora (Mexico). It is also reportedly naturalized in the South and Southeast Texas, Florida, Hawaii and extreme southwest Utah, the U.S. Virgin Islands, and Australia.

Ecology
Desert fan palms provide habitat for the giant palm-boring beetle, western yellow bat, hooded oriole, and many other bird species. Hooded orioles rely on the trees for food and places to build nests. Numerous insect species visit the hanging inflorescences that appear in late spring.

Historically, natural oases are mainly restricted to areas downstream from the source of hot springs, though water is not always visible at the surface.

Today's oasis environment may have been protected from colder climatic changes over the course of its evolution. Thus, this palm is restricted by both water and climate to widely separated relict groves. The trees in these groves show little if any genetic differentiation, (through electrophoretic examination), suggesting that the genus is genetically very stable.

Fire adaptations
Fan palm oases have historically been subject to both natural and manmade fires. Fires are rarely fatal for the fan palm, but it is also not completely immune to them.

The fan palm's trunk is heavily resistant to burning. In most cases, the trunk is only at risk of losing some of its outer vascular layers during a fire. After those layers are ignited and burnt off, the remaining surface is left heavily charred, which fortifies the trunk against future flames. Subsequent burnings serve to char the trunk more, further increasing its fire resistance. 

The palm's fronds are the most flammable portion of the tree. The unchecked buildup of dead fronds as a 'skirt' around the trunk can be especially dangerous in a crown fire. A severe accumulation of them could constitute enough kindling to completely burn through the trunk, killing the tree. However, if a palm can survive the burning of its fronds, they will take time to regrow, leaving it less susceptible to fire in the meantime.

Barring extreme, fatal conditions, fires are even conducive to the health and propagation of fan palms. The palms' reproduction process benefits from burnings, as fires help release saplings and clear away overgrowth from surrounding vegetation. Fires can also help palms conserve water by burning away their crowns and parts of their trunks, leading to a reduction in surface area and therefore decreased rates of evaporation and transpiration.

Threats
Grazing animals can kill young plants through trampling, or by eating the terminus at the apical meristem, the growing portion of the plant. This may have kept palms restricted to a lesser range than indicated by the availability of water.

The palm boring beetle Dinapate wrightii (Bostrichidae) can chew through the trunks of this and other palms. Eventually, a continued infestation of beetles can kill various genera and species of palms. W. filifera appears to be resistant to the red palm weevil (Rhynchophorus ferrugineus) by a mechanism of antibiosis – production of compounds lethal to the larvae.

Currently, the desert fan palm is experiencing a population and range expansion, perhaps due to global warming or mustang control.

Uses
The sweet fruit pulp of the fan palm is edible. The fruit was eaten raw, cooked, or ground into flour for cakes by Native Americans. The Cahuilla and related tribes used the leaves to make sandals, roof thatch, and baskets. The woody petioles were used to make cooking utensils. The Moapa band of Paiutes and other Southern Paiute people have written memories of using this palm's seed, fruit, or leaves for various purposes, including as famine food. The bud (known as heart of palm) has also been eaten.

Access
Joshua Tree National Park in the Mojave Desert preserves and protects healthy riparian palm habitat examples in the Little San Bernardino Mountains, and westward where water rises through the San Andreas Fault on the east valley side. In the central Coachella Valley, the Indio Hills Palms State Reserve and nearby Coachella Valley Preserve, other large oases are protected and accessible. The Santa Rosa and San Jacinto Mountains National Monument, and Anza-Borrego Desert State Park both have large and diverse W. filifera canyon oasis habitats.

Cultivation
Washingtonia filifera is widely cultivated as an ornamental tree. It is one of the hardiest coryphoid palms, rated as hardy to USDA hardiness zone 8. The plants grow best in Mediterranean climates, but can be found in humid subtropical climates such as eastern Australia and the southeastern USA. It has gained the Royal Horticultural Society's Award of Garden Merit.

Gallery

See also
 Washingtonia robusta Mexican fan palm
 Washingtonia × filibusta hybrid

References

External links

 Floridata.com: Washingtonia filifera
 Interactive Distribution Map for Washingtonia filifera
 USDA Plants Profile: Washingtonia filifera (California fan palm)
 UC Jepson Manual treatment – Washingtonia filifera
 Calflora Database: Washingtonia filifera (California fan palm)
 Washingtonia filifera in Flora of North America
 Washingtonia filifera (California fan palm) – U.C. CalPhotos Gallery

filifera
Flora of the California desert regions
Flora of the Coachella Valley
Flora of Riverside County, California
Flora of the Sonoran Deserts
Natural history of the Colorado Desert
Trees of the Southwestern United States
Trees of Baja California
Plants described in 1879
Garden plants of North America
Drought-tolerant trees
Ornamental trees